Northfield Mountain, is a mountain ridge located in Erving and Northfield, Massachusetts.  long by  long, the mountain is composed of several distinct peaks and ledges, most notably Rattlesnake Mountain (also known as Farley Ledge) , Rose Ledges , and Hermit Mountain (the high point). A pumped-storage hydroelectric plant and reservoir occupies the top of the mountain west of the summit.

The  Metacomet-Monadnock Trail crosses the summit ridge of Northfield Mountain; a series of shorter hiking trails, cross country ski trails, a cross-country running course, and rock climbing routes are also located on the mountain and its ledges. Northfield Mountain is located at the confluence of the Connecticut River and Millers River. A waterfall, Briggs Brook Falls, plunges from its southeast side.

Pumped-storage hydroelectricity facility

Engineering studies began in October 1964, with early site preparation starting three years later. In 1972 its 1,080-megawatt hydroelectric plant became operational as the largest such facility in the world.

Recreation

FirstLight Power Resources also manages recreational resources on the mountain as part of their agreement with the state of Massachusetts. A cross-country ski area is located on the mountain; it includes groomed trails, warming huts, and ski instruction. The 114 mile (183 km) Metacomet-Monadnock Trail traverses the mountain, as do a number of shorter trails. FirstLight also offers camping at nearby Barton Cove, environmental programs, and boat tours of the Connecticut River.

Rose Ledge and Farley Ledges are popular among rock climbers. Farley Ledge has been subject to recent conservation and climbing access initiatives. Hermit Mountain is the site of "Hermit's Castle," a state historic site where John Smith, a local recluse, made his home from 1857 to 1900.

Geologic history
Northfield Mountains' geologic story can begin in the late pre-Cambrian Period.  The ancient pre-Cambrian rocks are more than 600 million years old and are found only in the Western Berkshires of Massachusetts and in the Green Mountains of Vermont.

See also 

 Farley Ledges
 Metacomet-Monadnock Trail

References

External links
 Northfield Mountain Recreation & Environmental Programs

Mountains of Franklin County, Massachusetts
Mountains of Massachusetts
Climbing areas of the United States
Sports in Franklin County, Massachusetts